A pyrophone, also known as a "fire/explosion organ" or "fire/explosion calliope" is a musical instrument in which notes are sounded by explosions, or similar forms of rapid combustion, rapid heating, or the like, such as burners in cylindrical glass tubes, creating light and sound. It was invented by physicist and musician Georges Frédéric Eugène Kastner (born 1852 in Strasbourg, France - died 1882 in Bonn, Germany), son of composer Jean-Georges Kastner, around 1870.

Design

Related musical instruments
The pyrophone is similar to the steam calliope, but the difference is that in the calliope the combustion is external to the resonant cavity, whereas the pyrophone is an internal combustion instrument. The difference initially seems insignificant, but external combustion is what gives the calliope its staccato. Operating under the constant pressures of an external combustion chamber, the calliope merely directs exhaust (HB# 421.22: internal fipple flutes). By controlling the combustion specific to each resonant chamber, the pyrophone has, for better or worse, a greater range of variables in play when producing tones. In a mechanical pyrophone, trigger weight per key is related to comparatively lower backpressure of combustible gas. Again, the force of combustion happens in the resonance chamber; rather than controlling the exhaust of an explosion that has already happened in order to produce tones, the pyrophone controls the explosion to produce the tone.

Pyrophone history

Pyrophones originated in the 19th century. Byron Higgins, using hydrogen burning within the bottom of an open glass tube, first pointed out that if flame is placed in a glass tube sound may be produced in 1777 and in 1818 Michael Faraday attributed the tones to very rapid explosions. Physicist John Tyndall demonstrated that flame(s) in a tube may be made to sound if they are placed close to one third the length of the tube, the explosion occurs at a rate which matches the fundamental or one of the harmonics of the tube, and the volume of the flame is not too great. Brewer, Moigno, and de Parville describe Kastner as having invented the instrument about twenty years before 1890, and he filed a patent on Christmas Eve of 1874. Charles Gounod attempted to include the organ in his opera Jeanne d'Arc (1873) and the instrument was shown in the Paris Exhibition (1878). Henry Dunant was a proponent, and Wendelin Weißheimer composed Five Sacred Sonnets for Voice, Flute, Oboe, Clarinet, Pyrophone and Piano (1880).

Pyrophone fuel sources
Pyrophones are usually powered by propane, but gasoline powered mobile units have been built, to connect to automobile fuel intake manifolds and use the spark plugs and wiring, etc., to detonate one or more of the chambers. Hydrogen pyrophones are often made using upside-down glass test tubes as the combustion chambers. Different colors were probably not achieved in Kastner's time, but would be possible with the addition of salts to the flames.

See also
 Pulsation reactor
 Rijke tube
 Thermoacoustics

References

Further reading
 Kastner, Georges Frédéric Eugène (1875/1876). . 3rd edition. Paris: E. Dentu.  Publication date 1876

External links

Audio

Video

Cinema
 

Aerophones
Crystallophones
Plasmaphones
French musical instruments
French inventions